Firmino Baptista is a paralympic athlete from Portugal competing mainly in category T11 sprint events.

Baptista competed in his first Paralympics in 2000 where he ran in the 100m and 200m, winning a silver medal in the 200m.  He also competed in the following two Paralympics in 2004 and 2008 but despite competing in the 100m, 200m and the 4 × 100 m was unable to win any further medals.

References

Paralympic athletes of Portugal
Athletes (track and field) at the 2000 Summer Paralympics
Athletes (track and field) at the 2004 Summer Paralympics
Athletes (track and field) at the 2008 Summer Paralympics
Paralympic silver medalists for Portugal
Portuguese male sprinters
Living people
Medalists at the 2000 Summer Paralympics
Medalists at the World Para Athletics European Championships
Year of birth missing (living people)
Paralympic medalists in athletics (track and field)
Visually impaired sprinters
Paralympic sprinters
Blind people
Portuguese people with disabilities